Sandra B. Alcosser (born February 3, 1944) is an American poet. She was appointed the first state poet laureate of Montana from July 13, 2005 - August 13, 2007 and was superseded by Greg Pape.

Life
She started the MFA in writing program at San Diego State University and is on the faculty of the low-residency MFA in writing program at Pacific University.

Awards
 James Laughlin Award, for Except By Nature
 1997 National Poetry Series, for Except by Nature

Works
 A Fish To Feed All Hunger (Ahsahta Press, 1986)
 Except By Nature (Graywolf Press, 1998)

References

External links 
 MFA Program at SDSU founded by Alcosser

American women poets
Writers from Montana
Pacific University faculty
1944 births
Living people
20th-century American poets
20th-century American women writers
American women academics
21st-century American women
Poets Laureate of Montana